Diversity Icebreaker is a questionnaire used in seminars where the aim is to improve communication and interaction in the group or between different departments or subsidiaries in a bigger company or organization. Based on the results from the questionnaire the participants are divided into three categories (Red, Blue and Green). Each color represents a certain set of preferences. The facilitator is suggested to follow a certain seminar structure to bring out the effect of helping the participants develop a shared understanding about effective ways to communicate and work together with people with different preferences.

Red, Blue and Green 
Red preference is characterized by a strong focus on relations, personal involvement and a social perspective. Blue preference is recognized by focus on structure and task, and through a logic perspective. Green perspective is seen in focus on change, vision and ideas. The meaning of the three categories is established during the seminar. It originates from the questionnaire's items (questions) as well as from participant's personal experiences and the local culture, thus making the categories of Red, Blue and Green flexible and applicable in many contexts.

Workshop 
The Diversity Icebreaker is a process tool often used within the classic seminar structure explained by Ekelund and Langvik in their book “Diversity Icebreaker. How to manage diversity processes”. The seminar is usually run for groups from 9 to 150 persons and lasts between one and two hours. The participants are divided into groups – red, blue or green – based on the questionnaire.

Through the seminar process the sense of the categories is worked out by the participants themselves. They discover the effect of putting labels on each other, as well as the effect of “us” versus “the others” way of thinking. A systematic use of humor is central in the process and stimulates the participants to a safe and open reflection about differences.

Users of the concept 
Diversity Icebreaker is used to work on a wide range of subjects from focus on communication and interaction in general to more specific topics like team development, intercultural relations, learning styles and conflict resolution. Users vary from bigger multinationals to smaller companies independently of sector of activity, schools and universities, non-profit organizations, etc.

Romani describes how she uses the concept when teaching in multicultural classes of business students in Singapore, making the students aware of how the self-other categories have effects on the group dynamics. Similar application of the concept in Bangladesh is reported by Orgeret. The Diversity Icebreaker is also named in a book by Maureen B. Rabotin  among other tools relevant for improving cooperation across cultures.

Application of the Diversity Icebreaker was also named in the area of mentoring  The concept's application in the area of diversity management was discussed by Urstad.

Development 
Diversity Icebreaker as a psychological questionnaire was developed by Bjørn Z. Ekelund. The work started following a project in 1995 where focus groups were asked to give ideas on how to communicate to obtain changes in behavior of other people. When the participants sorted the ideas, three main categories occurred. These categories were used for the first time in 1995 in marketing campaigns and training of consultants, where the aim was to reduce energy consumption among power supplier's customers. The development of the categories and evaluation of the first campaign were presented in Bjørn Z. Ekelund's MBA thesis for

The first edition of the questionnaire which identified an individual's preference towards one of the roles Red/Blue/Green was made in 1998 and published in a book about team development published by Dansk Psykologisk Forlag in Denmark. Since then, the questionnaire has been reedited in 2003 and 2005. Since 2012, the concept is branded in the UK and in the USA under the name Trialogue.

Ekelund was awarded the prize "Consultant of the Year 2008" for the development of the Diversity Icebreaker The Research Council of Norway supported development of the tool in the years 2011-2012

Norms 
Norm data collected up to September 2011 gives results from all together about 240 samples with a total of 8859 respondents. This gives the opportunity to compare norm groups related to profession and nationality. The results show that women score lower on Blue and higher on Red than men, and vice versa. Only small differences were detected what concerns age – where persons above 60 years score higher on Blue

Internal Consistency 
The internal consistency measured by Cronbach's alpha based upon 473 respondents is reported to be between 0.75 and 0.82 The test-retest reliability was reported for Blue r(tt)=.872, for Red r(tt)=.793 and Green r(tt)=.838, p<.001.

Validation of Red, Blue and Green towards other psychological concepts 

So far the dimensions Red, Blue and Green have been systematically validated against personality traits, emotional intelligence, cultural values, Interpersonal Problems (IIP), flow and team processes.

The Red, Blue and Green categories have also been used in marketing through research about Brand Personality

Det Norske Veritas Germanischer Lloyd Business Assurance accreditation 
As of 27 November 2013 the Diversity Icebreaker holds the Det Norske Veritas Germanischer Lloyd accreditation for psychological tests used for development in team-related contexts. This certification has been developed in accordance with the guidelines from the European Federation of Psychologists' Associations The distributor of Diversity Icebreaker has made public the documentation it had submitted to Det Norske Veritas. In 2016, the Diversity Icebreaker has successfully passed the Det Norske Veritas Germanischer Lloyd triennial recertification. This time the distributor of Diversity Icebreaker also made the documentation public.

Critics 
Further conceptual work needs to be carried out for comparing the three categories with other psychological tools concerning for instance communication preferences, problem solving styles and thinking styles.

The connection between the use of Diversity Icebreaker as a tool to measure as well as the development of the categories during the seminar, mix several theoretical traditions (psychology, sociology and linguistics). So far, it is not clear how this can be handled theoretically and which practical implications that will follow.

Despite that Diversity Icebreaker is widely used and there are much information available, there are few articles published in referee based journals.

Literature 

Human resource management
Industrial and organizational psychology
Cross-cultural psychology
Personality tests
Human communication